Alessio Allegria (born 28 July 1995) is a Belgian footballer who plays for Belgian side Thes Sport.

Career

Allegra started his senior career with S.V. Zulte Waregem in 2013. In 2017, he signed for Shakhter Karagandy in the Kazakhstan Premier League where he made thirteen appearances and scored one goal. After that, he played for Belgian clubs K. Patro Eisden Maasmechelen and K.V.V. Thes Sport Tessenderlo, where he plays now.

References

External links 
 -35°C en verdachte infusen: leven als Belgische voetballer in Kazachstan 
 heet weer gewoon Allegria
 “In Kazachstan lachen ze niet met Borat” 
 Genkse voetballer doet opvallende transfer: “Geen enkele Belg heeft me dit voorgedaan” 
 Алессио Аллегриа: «Я легко реализую голевые моменты»
 “We moeten straks clever én snel spelen” 
 Alessio Allegria: "J’avais faim de ballon" 
 Alessio Allegria championstattoo 
 Het Nieuwsblad Tag 
 Gazet van Antwerpen Tag 
 [https://www.thes-sport.be/player/allegria-alessio/

Living people
1995 births
FC Shakhter Karagandy players
S.V. Zulte Waregem players
Belgian footballers
Belgian expatriate footballers
Association football forwards
Belgian people of Italian descent
Expatriate footballers in Kazakhstan
Belgian expatriate sportspeople in Kazakhstan
K. Patro Eisden Maasmechelen players
AS Verbroedering Geel players
R.F.C. Seraing (1922) players
K.V.V. Thes Sport Tessenderlo players